Ian Matthew Morris (born 27 January 1960) is a British historian, archaeologist, and Willard Professor of Classics at Stanford University.

Early life
Morris was born on 27 January 1960 in Stoke-on-Trent, Staffordshire, England. He attended Alleyne's High School, a comprehensive school in Stone, Staffordshire. He studied at the University of Birmingham, graduating with a Bachelor of Arts (BA) degree in 1981. He undertook a Doctor of Philosophy (PhD) degree at the University of Cambridge, graduating in 1985. His doctoral thesis was titled "Burial and society at Athens, 1100-500 BC".

Career
From 1987 to 1995, he taught at the University of Chicago. Since 1995, he has been at Stanford.

Since joining Stanford, he has served as Associate Dean of Humanities and Sciences, Chair of the Classics Department, and Director of the Social Science History Institute. He was one of the founders of the Stanford Archaeology Center and has served two terms as its director. He has published extensively on the history and the archaeology of the ancient Mediterranean and on world history. He has also won a Dean's Award for Excellence in Teaching in 2009.

Between 2000 and 2007, he directed Stanford's excavation at Monte Polizzo, Sicily, Italy.

He has been awarded research fellowships from the John Simon Guggenheim Memorial Foundation, Hoover Institution, National Endowment for the Humanities, Center for Hellenic Studies in Washington, D.C., and Institute for Research in the Humanities, University of Wisconsin-Madison. He is also a Corresponding Fellow of the British Academy and has been awarded honorary degrees by De Pauw University and Birmingham University. In 2012 his work was the subject of a lengthy profile in the Chronicle of Higher Education. He delivered the Tanner Lectures on Human Values at Princeton University in 2012.

Ian Morris plans to develop his views on the first-millennium BC transformations (the shift from religion-based power to bureaucratic and military one, and the rise of Axial thought) in his new book.

Why the West Rules—For Now

His 2010 book, Why the West Rules—For Now, compares East and West across the last 15,000 years, arguing that physical geography, rather than culture, religion, politics, genetics, or great men, explains Western domination of the globe. The Economist has called it "an important book—one that challenges, stimulates and entertains. Anyone who does not believe there are lessons to be learned from history should start here." The book won several literary awards, including the 2011 PEN Center USA Literary Award for Creative Nonfiction, and was named as one of the books of the year by Newsweek, Foreign Affairs, Foreign Policy,  The New York Times, and a number of other newspapers. It has been translated into 13 languages.

The Measure of Civilization

The Measure of Civilization is a companion volume to Why the West Rules—For Now. It provides details of the evidence and the statistical methods used by Morris to construct the social development index that he used in Why the West Rules to compare long-term Eastern and Western history. The International Studies Association and Social Science History Association devoted panels to discussing the book at their 2013 annual meetings. The book is being translated into Chinese.

War! What is it Good For?
War! What is it Good For?: Conflict and the Progress of Civilization from Primates to Robots was published by Farrar, Straus & Giroux in the US and Profile Books in Britain in April 2014. Morris argues that there is enough evidence to trace the history of violence across many thousands of years and that a startling fact emerges. For all of its horrors, over the last 10,000 years, war has made the world safer and richer, as it is virtually the only way that people have found to create large, internally pacified societies that then drive down the rate of violent death. The lesson of the last 10,000 years of military history, he argues, is that the way to end war is by learning to manage it, not by trying to wish it out of existence. Morris also devotes a chapter to the 1974-1978 Gombe Chimpanzee War in Tanzania. The German translation of the book, Krieg: Wozu er gut ist, was published by Campus Verlag in October 2013. A Dutch translation was published in 2014 by Spectrum (Houten/Antwerp): Verwoesting en vooruitgang. Five more translations are being prepared.

Awards and honors
2014 California Book Awards Nonfiction Finalist for War! What is it Good For?

Bibliography
 Burial and Ancient Society, Cambridge, 1987  
 Death-Ritual and Social Structure in Classical Antiquity, Cambridge 1992  
 Editor, Classical Greece: Ancient Histories and Modern Archaeologies, Cambridge, 1994  
 Co-editor, with Barry B. Powell, A New Companion to Homer, E. J. Brill, 1997  
 Co-editor, with Kurt Raaflaub, Democracy 2500? Questions and Challenges, Kendall-Hunt, 1997  
 Archaeology as Cultural History, Blackwell, 2000 
 The Greeks: History, Culture, and Society, with Barry B. Powell; Prentice-Hall, 1st ed. 2005, 2nd ed. 2009 
 Co-editor, with Joe Manning, The Ancient Economy: Evidence and Models, Stanford, 2005 
 Co-editor, with Walter Scheidel and Richard Saller, The Cambridge Economic History of the Greco-Roman World, Cambridge, 2007 
 Co-editor, with Walter Scheidel, of The Dynamics of Ancient Empires,  Oxford, 2009 
 Why the West Rules—For Now: The Patterns of History, and What They Reveal About the Future, Farrar, Straus and Giroux, 2010; Profile Books, 2010 
 The Measure of Civilisation: How Social Development Decides the Fate of Nations, Princeton University Press, 2013; Profile Books, 2013 
 War! What is it Good For? Conflict and the Progress of Civilization from Primates to Robots, Farrar, Straus and Giroux, 2014; Profile Books, 2014 
 Foragers, Farmers, and Fossil Fuels: How Human Values Evolve (The Tanner Lectures, edited and with an introduction by Stephen Macedo and commentaries by Richard Seaford, Jonathan D. Spence, Christine M. Korsgaard, and Margaret Atwood), Princeton University Press, 2015; 
 Geography Is Destiny: Britain and the World: A 10,000-Year History, Farrar, Straus and Giroux, 2022; Profile Books, 2022 ISBN 9780374157272

References

External links

 Ian Morris , Stanford University Classics Department.
 Classics and History Expert - Ian Morris, Stanford University Humanities Department.
 Why the West Rules for Now, Interview with Ian Morris in www.theglobaldispatches.com.
 Ian Morris interview on "Conversations With History,"  a UC Berkeley podcast and video series.
 ' Foreign Policy magazine review  of Why the West Rules.
 Increased Affluence Explains the Emergence of Ascetic Wisdoms and Moralizing Religions, an article together with Nicolas Baumard, Alexandre Hyafil and Pascal Boyer

1960 births
Alumni of the University of Birmingham
Alumni of the University of Cambridge
American archaeologists
21st-century American historians
21st-century American male writers
Futurologists
Living people
Stanford University Department of Classics faculty
Corresponding Fellows of the British Academy
British archaeologists
British historians
American male non-fiction writers